The MAMA Awards (formerly Mnet Asian Music Awards) is a major music awards ceremony presented annually by entertainment company CJ E&M. First held in South Korea, the majority of prizes has been won by K-pop artists, although there are other Asian artists winning in various award categories, such as for Best Asian Artist and other professional-related awards.

The awards ceremony was first held in Seoul in 1999, being aired on Mnet. MAMA has also been held in various Asian countries and cities outside of South Korea since 2010 and now airs internationally online beyond Asia.

History

Ceremony 
The event was launched in 1999 as a music video awards ceremony, modeled after the MTV Video Music Awards, called the Mnet Music Video Festival. It merged with the KMTV Korean Music Awards in 2004 and was renamed the Mnet KM Music Video Festival. By the mid-2000s, the awards ceremony had attracted some international interest due to the spread of Hallyu, and it aired in China and Japan in 2008.

In 2009, the event was renamed the Mnet Asian Music Awards (MAMA) to reflect its expansion outside of South Korea. In 2010, MAMA was held in Macau, marking the first time it was held outside of South Korea. The following year, in 2011, MAMA was held in Singapore, and was then held in Hong Kong from 2012 to 2017. In 2017, the awards ceremony was expanded to four nights, and parts of the event were held in Vietnam and Japan, in addition to Hong Kong. In 2018, MAMA had three parts and was held in three countries; South Korea hosted the MAMA for the first time in nine years, together with Japan and Hong Kong. In 2020, MAMA was held online only and took place in South Korea only due to the COVID-19 pandemic.

On July 20, 2021, it was reported by Ilgan Sports that the 2021 Mnet Asian Music Awards was undergoing discussion for the event to be held in Hong Kong despite the ongoing pandemic and travel restrictions. On August 23, 2022, CJ E&M announced that the event would be rebranded as simply the "MAMA Awards" going forward.

Event name
 Mnet Video Music Awards (1999)
 Mnet Music Video Festival (2000–2003)
 Mnet KM Music Video Festival (2004–2005)
 Mnet KM Music Festival (2006–2008)
 Mnet Asian Music Awards (2009–2021)
 MAMA Awards (2022–present)

Host venues

Award categories

Grand Prizes

The four grand prizes (known as daesang)

 Artist of the Year
 Album of the Year
 Song of the Year
 Worldwide Icon of the Year (since 2018)

Competitive awards
Unless otherwise noted, each award category was introduced in 1999.
 Best Male Artist
 Best Female Artist
 Best Male Group (since 2000, was known as Best Group in 1999)
 Best Female Group (since 2000)
 Best New Artist
 Best Dance Performance
 Best Band Performance
 Best Rap Performance
 Best Vocal Performance (since 2010)
 Best Collaboration (2010, 2012, 2014–2017, 2019–present)
 Best OST (2004)
 Best Music Video (since 2006)
 Best Unit (2018)

Special awards

These awards have been given once or occasionally.
 Best International Artist (1999–2006, 2009–2010, 2012–2014, 2019, 2021)
 Best Asian Artist (since 2004)
 Other special awards

Discontinued awards
 Music Video of the Year (1999–2005)(former daesang award and currently Best Music Video since 2006)
 Best Popular Music Video (1999–2005)(former daesang award)
 Best Music Video Performance (2005–2007)
 Best Music Video Director (1999–2006)
 Best Mixed Group (2000–2009)
 Best Ballad Performance (1999–2009)
 Best R&B Performance (2000–2007)
 Best Indie Performance (1999–2002)
 Best House & Electronic Performance (2007–2009)
 Best Trot Performance (2009)
 Best Digital Single (2010)

Most wins

Daesang awards
The following lists the artist(s) who received two or more daesang awards.(Includes Artist of the Year, Album of the Year, Song of the Year, and Worldwide Icon of the Year)

Competitive awards 
The following lists the artist(s) who received two or more competitive awards.

Controversies

Boycotting incidents 
In 2007, Lee Min-woo and Shin Hye-sung from the group Shinhwa canceled their appearance at the event one hour before the awards ceremony began. Shin later said they left because they did not trust the event to fairly select winners.

In 2009, entertainment companies Inwoo Production and SM Entertainment boycotted the 2009 awards ceremony with none of their artists attending. Both companies said the reason for their boycott was that they questioned the fairness of the voting process. In particular, SM Entertainment said that Girls' Generation had held the #1 spot on a music chart for nine consecutive weeks, but the group never won first place on Mnet's weekly M Countdown music show. The company also criticized a mobile poll which required participants to pay money in order to vote. In 2010, SM Entertainment artists also did not attend the year's awards ceremony.

Voter fraud 
Prior to the 2017 awards ceremony, Mnet found that some fans had cast fraudulent votes through the use of bots. As a result, Mnet temporarily halted voting, then nullified all fraudulent votes, blocked relevant IP addresses, and deleted relevant user accounts.

Broadcasting
The show was broadcast live in over 13 countries across Asia. In South Korea, it is broadcast on Mnet, TVING and across CJ E&M channels where it was available. Other broadcasters that also broadcast the event include Mnet Japan, Mnet Smart+, au Smart Pass (which sponsored the awards), tvN Asia, Far EasTone Mobile Circle app & friDay Video, MeWATCH, TonTon & FPT Play. Previously the awards show was aired on JOOX, ViuTV, alongside with Smart GigaPlay and Vidio, in which both of the latered platform has already include tvN Asia.

The show is also broadcast online via Mnet K-POP, Mnet TV, M2, as well as KCON official YouTube channel for the rest of the world.

Notes

References

External links
 
 

Asian music
 
South Korean music awards
South Korea annual television specials
Awards established in 1999
CJ E&M Music Performance Division
Annual events in South Korea
1999 establishments in South Korea
Performing arts trophies